Vinko Valentar (born 21 March 1934) is a Slovenian ice hockey player. He competed in the men's tournament at the 1964 Winter Olympics.

References

1934 births
Living people
Slovenian ice hockey forwards
Olympic ice hockey players of Yugoslavia
Ice hockey players at the 1964 Winter Olympics
Sportspeople from Jesenice, Jesenice
Yugoslav ice hockey forwards
HK Acroni Jesenice players